Əşlə (also, Əshlə, Eshlya, and Eşlə) is a village and municipality in the Lankaran Rayon of Azerbaijan.  It has a population of 317.

References 

Populated places in Lankaran District